Haramata (English: Dawn) is the first studio album by Greek singer Giorgos Sabanis,  released on 21 March 2008 by Sony BMG Greece. All the music on the album was written by Sabanis.

Track listing 
"S' Afino Ston Epomeno" (Σ' Αφήνω Στον Επόμενο; Let's Go Next) – 3:11
"Haramata" (Χαράματα; Dawn) – 4:35
"Pathos" (Πάθος; Passion) – 3:45
"Moirasia" (Duet with Christos Dantis), (Μοιρασιά; Shares) – 3:25
"Dio Nisia" (Δυο Νησιά; Two Islands) – 4:10
"O Mavros Panthiras" (Ο Μαύρος Πάνθηρας; The Black Panther) – 3:25
"Mia Fora Ki Ena Kairo" (Μια Φορά Κι Ένα Καιρό; Once Upon a Time) – 3:45
"San Trelos Rithmos" (	Σαν Τρελός Ρυθμός; Like a Crazy Rhythm) – 4:40
"(Panta Na Afineis) Ena Fos Anoihto" (Πάντα Να Αφήνεις; Always Leave Me), (Ένα Φως Ανοιχτό; A Light Open") – 2:30
"Kapou Allou Ki Ohi Edo" (Κάπου Αλλού Κι Όχι Εδώ; Somewhere Else And Not Here) – 3:10
"O Ipnos Malose Me To Mialo" (Ο Ύπνος Μάλωσε Με Το Μυαλό; Sleep Suffered By The Mind) – 4:17
"Ase Na Peftei I Vrohi" (Άσε Να Πέφτει Η Βροχή; Let The Rain Fall) – 3:44
"Pathos (La Passione Remix)" – 4:35

Personnel
Yannis Doxas – executive producer
Kostas Drimtzias – photography
Dimitris Rekouniotis – artwork
Vasilis Tsouparopoulos – mastering
Kostas Zisis – styling

References

2008 debut albums
Greek-language albums
Sony Music Greece albums